Logan School may refer to:

Logan School for Creative Learning, Denver, Colorado
Logan School (Columbia, South Carolina), listed on the U.S. National Register of Historic Places